San Mamés is a  transfer station in Bilbao, Basque Country, Spain. It is located in the neighbourhood of Basurto, part of the Basurto-Zorroza district of Bilbao. The station connects the rapid transit network of Bilbao metro with the Cercanías Bilbao commuter rail services, as well as with the Bilbao tram. It is also directly connected to Bilbao Intermodal, the city's main bus station. The station is also located in close proximity to San Mamés Stadium, home of the Athletic Club Bilbao. Since 2017, the metro station has been known as Santimami/San Mamés.

History 
The station opened as part of line 1 of the Bilbao metro on 11 November 1995. The station was below Alameda de Urquijo, between San Mamés Stadium, the Termibus bus station, and Sabino Arana Avenue; the main access to the city from the A-8 motorway. Thus the station had a very high traffic of passengers commuting daily from other parts of the metropolitan area to the bus station, and to the stadium on match days.

In 2000, the San Mamés station of the Cercanías Bilbao commuter rail network (operated by Renfe) opened on a nearby location. The station was built on an existing trench which was put underground. Despite both stations being in close proximity, they were not physically connected. In addition to that, a third stop opened in 2002 as part of the Bilbao tram; it was overground and closer to the bus station.

The interchange station was built in 2004 allowing for an easy connection between the metro and Cercanías stations, which now share a common access and hall, which also connects them directly to the bus station entrance and the tram stop, which was relocated closer to the new station. In 2017 works began for the construction of a new underground bus station, which involved temporarily shutting down the direct connection between the interchange station and the bus terminal. The connection was reopened in November 2019, after the opening of the new Bilbao Intermodal bus station.

Station layout 
The station consists in truth of two separate underground stations connected by a common hall. The metro station follows the typical cavern-shaped layout of most underground Metro Bilbao stations designed by Norman Foster, with the main hall located directly above the rail tracks, whereas the Cercanías Bilbao station follows a rectangular design with high ceilings.

Access 

  17 Sabino Arana Av. (Sabino Arana exit, Metro Bilbao only)
  23 Luis Briñas St. (Briñas - Termibús - Renfe exit)
  13 Luis Briñas St. (Briñas exit, Metro Bilbao only)
  Ingeniero Torres Quevedo Plaza (Torres Quevedo exit, Cercanías Bilbao only)

Services 
The metro station is served by line 1 from Etxebarri to Ibarbengoa and Plentzia, and by line 2 from Basauri to Kabiezes. The Cercanías Bilbao lines that call at this station connect Bilbao with other municipalities across its metropolitan area. There is also a tram stop on the surface, served by Bilbao's single tram line. Additionally, the station is directly connected to the Bilbao Intermodal bus station, with long-distance and regional Bizkaibus bus services.

References

External links
 

Line 1 (Bilbao metro) stations
Line 2 (Bilbao metro) stations
Buildings and structures in Bilbao
Railway stations in Spain opened in 1995
1995 establishments in the Basque Country (autonomous community)
Railway stations in Spain opened in 2000
2000 establishments in the Basque Country (autonomous community)
Railway stations in Biscay
Tram stops